The Thieves is a 1959 Italian-Spanish criminal comedy film written and directed by Lucio Fulci and starring Totò and Giovanna Ralli.

Plot
Gangster Joe Castagneto is declared undesirable by the U.S. government and returns to Naples where, under a special surveillance, he will have to deal with the hard-working and smart Police Commissioner Gennaro Di Sapio.

Cast 
 Totò as Police Commissioner Gennaro Di Sapio
 Armando Calvo as  Joe Castagnato/Inspector Mac Millan
 Giovanna Ralli as  Maddalena Scognamiglio, Vincenzo's wife
 Giacomo Furia as  Vincenzo Scognamiglio
 Enzo Turco as  Brigadier Lanocella
 Fred Buscaglione as himself
 Juan José Menéndez as  Alberto 
 Rafael Luis Calvo as  Ciardella
 Maria Luisa Rolando as  Concetta Improta
 Felix Fernandex as Dr. Ascione

Release
The Thieves was released on June 27, 1959.

See also
 List of Italian films of 1959

References

External links

 
 
 

Italian crime comedy films
1950s crime comedy films
Spanish crime comedy films
Films directed by Lucio Fulci
Films set in Naples
1950s Italian films